The Sunnmøre Museum Foundation is a foundation comprising 12 museums in the Sunnmøre traditional district of the western Norwegian county of Møre og Romsdal.

The museums in the foundation are:
The Sunnmøre Museum in Borgundgavlen in Ålesund
The Aalesund Museum and Fisheries Museum in Ålesund
The Brudavoll Farm in Ørsta
The Dalsfjord Lighthouse Museum in Dalsfjord in Volda
The Godøy Coastal Museu at Godøy in Giske
The Herøy Coastal Museum in Herøy
The Furniture Museum in Sykkylven
The Sivert Aarflot Museum at Ekset in Volda
The Sykkylven Natural History Museum in Sykkylven
The Volda Open Air Museum in Volda
The Ytste Skotet Farm in the municipality of Stordal
The Møre og Romsdal Agricultural Museum at Gjermundnes in Vestnes

References

External links
Sunnmøre Museum Foundation website

Museums in Møre og Romsdal